Maywood was a Dutch singing duo consisting of sisters Aaltje ("Alie") and Doetje ("Edith") de Vries. They each took on a stage name for the project:  Alie, a blonde, (songwriting, background and harmony vocals, keyboards) became "Alice May" and the dark-haired Edith (lead vocals) became "Caren Wood".

The duo were active as recording artists between 1978 and 1992, and their best known songs are "Late At Night" (a #1 hit in the Netherlands, and a significant chart hit in several other nations), "Give Me Back My Love", and "Rio".  All but one of their singles were written solely by Alice May; "Kom In Mijn Armen", a #33 hit from 1989, was co-written by May and Aad Klaris.  Through 1986, their material was produced and arranged by Pim Koopman; later records were produced by Koopman, Klaris, or Ton Scherpenzeel.  They represented the Netherlands in the 1990 Eurovision Song Contest (Zagreb) with the song "Ik wil alles met je delen" (I Want to Share Everything With You), which finished in fifteenth place. The group split up in 1995, but re-formed for a series of Gerard Joling concerts with whom they performed a medley of their hit songs including "Mother, How Are You Today" (it became one of their most popular songs in Indonesia), in October 2013.
In 2006 Alice announced her return without her sister Caren, but with an unknown artist named Rose Louwers. Their first performance was in Antwerp, Belgium, in December 2006.

Discography

Albums

Singles

References

External links

Biografie van Maywood op het Popinstituut 
www.maywood-online.de (with permission of Alice Maywood). Diese Seite besteht nicht mehr.
Biography

Dutch musical duos
Dutch girl groups
Musical groups established in 1979
Musical groups disestablished in 1995
Eurovision Song Contest entrants for the Netherlands
Eurovision Song Contest entrants of 1990
Sibling musical duos
Nationaal Songfestival contestants
Female musical duos
Pop music duos
Dutch pop music groups